Lankascincus sripadensis, also commonly known as the Sripada forest skink, is a species of lizard in the family Scincidae. The species is endemic to the island of Sri Lanka.

References

 http://reptile-database.reptarium.cz/species?genus=Lankascincus&species=sripadensis
 http://eol.org/pages/23672828/overview
 Two new species of Skinks from Sri Lanka

Lankascincus
Reptiles described in 2007
Reptiles of Sri Lanka
Taxa named by Mendis Wickramasinghe
Taxa named by Roshan Rodrigo
Taxa named by Nihal Dayawansa
Taxa named by U. L. D. Jayantha